That Girl Lay Lay is an American comedy television series created by David A. Arnold that premiered on Nickelodeon on September 23, 2021. The series stars That Girl Lay Lay, Gabrielle Nevaeh Green, Tiffany Daniels, Thomas Hobson, Peyton Perrine III, and Caleb Brown.

Premise 
Struggling to make her mark at school and needing a best friend to talk to, Sadie wishes that Lay Lay, an artificially intelligent avatar from a personal affirmation app, were real and could help teach her how to stand out. When her wish comes true and Lay Lay is magically brought to life, they navigate life as teenagers and discover who they truly are, all while trying to keep Lay Lay's identity hidden.

Cast

Main 
 That Girl Lay Lay as Lay Lay, an artificially intelligent phone avatar that comes to life in the form of a human teen girl with special abilities
 Gabrielle Nevaeh Green as Sadie, a girl who owned the phone avatar version of Lay Lay until it came to life
 Tiffany Daniels as Trish, Sadie's mother
 Thomas Hobson as Bryce, Sadie's father
 Peyton Perrine III as Marky, Sadie's brother
 Caleb Brown as Jeremy (season 1), Sadie and Lay Lay's classmate
 Elijah M. Brown as Cobo (season 2)

Recurring 
 Andrea Barber as Principal Willingham
 Kensington Tallman as Tiffany, the most popular girl in school
 Ishmel Sahid as Woody
 Anna-Grace Arnold as Gigi

Production 
On March 18, 2021, That Girl Lay Lay was ordered to series by Nickelodeon for 13 episodes, set to star Alaya High, who is otherwise known as Lay Lay. The series was created by David A. Arnold, who also serves as showrunner, and is produced by Will Packer Productions. Production for the series began in summer 2021. David A. Arnold, Will Packer, Carolyn Newman, John Beck, and Ron Hart serve as executive producers. On July 2, 2021, it was announced that Gabrielle Nevaeh Green as Sadie, Peyton Perrine III as Marky, Tiffany Daniels as Trish, Thomas Hobson as Bryce, and Caleb Brown as Jeremy all joined the main cast. On August 26, 2021, it was announced that the series would premiere on September 23, 2021.

On January 28, 2022, the series was renewed for a second season, which premiered on July 14, 2022.

Episodes

Series overview

Season 1 (2021)

Season 2 (2022–23)

Broadcast 
The first season is available to stream on Netflix as of January 21, 2022. The second season was added to Netflix on February 23, 2023.

Reception

Ratings 
 

| link2             = #Season 2 (2022–23)
| episodes2         = 16
| start2            = 
| end2              = 
| startrating2      = 0.25
| endrating2        = 
| viewers2          = |2}} 
}}

Awards and nominations

References

External links 
 
 

2020s American children's comedy television series
2020s Nickelodeon original programming
2021 American television series debuts
English-language television shows